Dinamo Tbilisi's  first season in the 1990 Umaglesi Liga.

Season report
In 1990 the Georgian Football Federation refused to participate in the Soviet Union championship. That meant that no Georgian Football Clubs would appear in Soviet tournaments. From that moment the more recent history of FC Dinamo Tbilisi began.

The club played its first match in the Georgian National championship against Kolkheti-1913 Poti on 30 March 1990. Dinamo lost the historic match, 0–1. Ultimately the club recovered from this setback and won the first Georgian National championship.

Dinamo Tbilisi played by the name FC Iberia Tbilisi.

Current squad

Statistics

Appearances, goals and disciplinary record

Competitions

Umaglesi Liga

League table

Matches

Georgian Cup

External links 
 Georgian cup competition calendar
 Archive of FC Dinamo Tbilisi matches by seasons

FC Dinamo Tbilisi seasons
Din